Pughtown is an unincorporated community and census-designated place in Chester County, Pennsylvania. The community located in South Coventry Township on Pennsylvania Route 100 just south of Bucktown, Pennsylvania. As of 2020, the CDP has a population of 849.

Demographics

Education
It is in the Owen J. Roberts School District. Owen J. Roberts High School is the zoned comprehensive high school.

See also
 Townsend House

References

External Links
 Pughtown, PA Community Profile
 Map of Pughtown, PA

Unincorporated communities in Chester County, Pennsylvania
Unincorporated communities in Pennsylvania